The American Academy of Private Physicians (AAPP) is an association for concierge, or direct care, physicians, in the United States.  These doctors are paid directly by patients for their services – they do not work with insurance companies.

History

AAPP was founded in 2004 as the American Society for Concierge Physicians by John Blanchard, M.D. and Jack Marquis.  In 2006, it was renamed the Society for Innovative Medical Practice Design.  In 2010,  AAPP was reorganized under its current name.  Chris Ewin, M.D. was president at that time.

External links
DailyFinance.com article on AAPP
AAPP director featured on CNN Money

Medical associations based in the United States
Medical and health organizations based in Florida